Jake Goodwin (born 19 January 1998) is an English cricketer who played for Hampshire County Cricket Club. Primarily a right-handed batsman, he also bowls right-arm medium.

External links

1998 births
Living people
English cricketers
Sportspeople from Swindon
Hampshire cricketers
Wiltshire cricketers